Kasetsart University, commonly known and referred to as Kaset or KU, is a public research university in Bangkok, Thailand. It is the largest university in Thailand.  It was Thailand's first agricultural university and Thailand's third oldest university.  It was established on 2 February 1943 to promote subjects related to agricultural science. Since then, Kasetsart University has expanded its subject areas to cover life sciences, science, engineering, social sciences, and humanities. Kasetsart University's main campus is in Bangkhen, northern Bangkok, with several other campuses throughout Thailand.

History 

In 1902, King Chulalongkorn attempted to promote the country's silk, silverware, and weaving industries. He hired Dr Kametaro Toyama, from the University of Tokyo, to train Siamese students in Japanese silk and weaving crafts. In 1904, the School of Sericulture was founded at Tambon Thung Saladaeng, Bangkok by Prince Benbadhanabongse, the Director of the Department of Sericulture of the Ministry of Agriculture. The school was renamed the School of Agriculture in 1906.

In 1908, the School of the Ministry of Agriculture was founded at Windsor Palace as the Ministry of Agriculture merged three schools, the School of Surveying (founded in 1882), the School of Irrigation (founded in 1905), and the School of Agriculture. Thailand's first tertiary-level agriculture curriculum began to offer courses in 1909. However, the Siamese government merged the School of the Ministry of Agriculture with the Civil Service College in 1913, due to the objective of founding the school meets the royal initiative of establishment the Civil Service College of King Vajiravudh.

In 1917, Phraya Thepsartsatit and Chaophraya Thammasakmontri of the Ministry of Education founded the first primary school of agriculture under the Ministry of Agriculture, named the Primary School Agriculture Teacher Training School in Tambon Horwang. It moved to Tambon Phra Prathon, Nakhon Pathom Province in 1918.

In 1931, Prince Sithiporn Kridakara and Chaophraya Thammasakmontri together expanded the school regionally. In the central region, a campus was located in Saraburi Province, in the northern region in Chiang Mai Province, in the northeastern region in Nakhon Ratchasima Province, and in the southern region in Songkhla Province.

In 1935, the Primary School Agriculture Teacher Training School in each part of the country was closed and merged following the agricultural education policy in that time. Luang Ingkhasikasikan, Luang Suwan Vajokkasikij, and Phra Chuangkasetsinlapakan together proposed to maintain the Mae Jo School (today's Mae Jo University) at Chiang Mai Province only and renamed it Secondary-level Agriculture Technical School before it was elevated to the College of Agriculture, under the Department of Agriculture and Fisheries.

The Ministry of Agriculture established the Central Agriculture Station or "Kaset Klang", in Bang Khen District, Bangkok. It caused the College of Agriculture to move to Bang Khen District in 1938 and the government office at Chiang Mai Province became Kasetsart Preparatory School to prepare students to study at the College of Agriculture in Bang Khen.

In 1943, Field Marshal Plaek Phibunsongkhram promoted the College of Agriculture and established Kasetsart University as a department of the Ministry of Agriculture. The university initially consisted of four faculties: agriculture, fisheries, forestry, and cooperatives (today's divided into Faculty of Economics and Faculty of Business Administration).

In 1966, Mom Luang Xujati Kambhu, the Fifth President of Kasetsart University, judged the Bang Khen campus too confined and unable to support the education in agricultural sciences called for by the National Social and Economics Development Plan. The Kamphaeng Saen campus was established on 12 November 1979 as a result.

The university further expanded by establishing Sriracha campus, Chalermphrakiat Sakon Nakhon Province campus, Suphan Buri campus, Krabi campus and Lopburi campus. The university already established Si Racha campus in 1989 and the Chalermphrakiat Sakon Nakhon Province campus on 15 August 1996.

On 18 July 2015, the Kasetsart University Act B.E. 2558 (2015) transformed it from a public university to a national university.

Symbols

Phra Phirun
Kasetsart University's symbol is Phra Phirun, the god of rain mounted on a Nāga with encircled by lotus petals and then by the words "มหาวิทยาลัยเกษตรศาสตร์ พ.ศ. ๒๔๘๖" in the Thai version and "KASETSART UNIVERSITY 1943" in the English version.

Nontri tree
The Nontri tree has been a symbol of Kasetsart University since 1963. King Bhumibol Adulyadej and Queen Sirikit planted nine nontri trees in the front of Kasetsart University's main auditorium on 29 November 1963 which became historic day for Kasetsart University people.

The nontri is a tree in the family Fabaceae. It is a long-lived evergreen with grey-brown bark with upright branches. The leaves are bipinnate compound and the flowers are yellow, produced in large compound racemes. Its fruit is a pod containing seeds.

Organization

Bangkhen
Kasetsart University occupies  in Chatuchak District, Bangkok.

 Faculty of Agriculture
 Faculty of Agro-Industry
 Faculty of Architecture
 Faculty of Business Administration
 Faculty of Economics
 Faculty of Education
 Faculty of Engineering
 Faculty of Environment
 Faculty of Fisheries
 Faculty of Forestry
 Faculty of Humanities
 Faculty of Medicine
 Faculty of Science
 Faculty of Social Sciences
 Faculty of Veterinary Medicine
 Faculty of Veterinary Technology
 School of Integrated Science
 Graduate School
 International College Establishment Project

Kamphaeng Saen Campus
The Kamphaeng Saen Campus is the first and largest branch of Kasetsart University established in 1979. The campus is situated in Kamphaeng Saen District, Nakhon Pathom Province with the area of 7,951.75 rai (1272 hectares).

 Faculty of Agriculture at Kamphaeng Saen
 Faculty of Engineering at Kamphaeng Saen
 Faculty of Education and Development Sciences
 Faculty of Hospitality Industry
 Faculty of Liberal Arts and Science
 Faculty of Sports Science
 Faculty of Veterinary Medicine at Kamphaeng Saen

Sriracha Campus
The Sriracha Campus was established in 1988, and occupies an area of 199 rai (32 hectares) in the Si Racha District of Chonburi Province.

 Faculty of Management Sciences
 Faculty of Engineering at Sriracha
 Faculty of Science at Sriracha
 Faculty of Economics at Sriracha
 Faculty of International Maritime Studies

Chalermphrakiat Sakon Nakhon Province Campus
The Chalermphakiat Sakon Nakhon Province Campus was established in 1996 to commemorate the Golden Jubilee Anniversary of King Bhumibol Adulyadej's Accession to the Throne. The campus occupies the area of 4,488 rai (718 hectares) in Mueang District of Sakon Nakhon Province.
 Faculty of Natural Resources and Agro-Industry
 Faculty of Science and Engineering
 Faculty of Liberal Arts and Management Sciences
 Faculty of Public Health

Affiliated Institute
 Irrigation College
 Boromrajonani College of Nursing Napparat Vajira

Academic profile

Rankings

The QS World University Rankings 2021 ranked Kasetsart University 149th in Asia and 801-1000th in the world. For the QS World University Rankings by Subject 2021, the university was ranked 63rd in Agriculture & Forestry, 301-305th in Environmental Studies, 351-400th in Engineering - Chemical, 451-500th in Biological Sciences, Chemistry and Engineering - Mechanical, Aeronautical & Manufacturing, and 501-550th in Business & Management Studies. Kasetsart University was ranked 29th in Agriculture and Forestry worldwide in the QS World University Rankings 2017. It was ranked in the 651-700 tranche in the QS World University Rankings 2015–2016.

The Times Higher Education World University Rankings 2017–2018 ranked Kasetsart University in the 800-1000 tier in the world and 251-300th in the Emerging Economies. Moreover, the university was ranked 601-800th in Computer Science and Life Sciences, 601th+ in Business & Economics and Social Sciences, 801-1000th in Engineering & Technology, 1001+ in Physical Sciences by THE World University Rankings 2021 by subject.

Research
 Kasetsart University Research and Development Institute
Kasetsart University Research and Development Institute (KURDI) administers and coordinates research projects and research efforts.

 Institute of Food Research and Product Development
The Institute of Food Research and Product Development (IFRPD), is a science and food technology research institute, with the mandate to provide information and services to society as well as research in support of governmental policies to resolve the country's economic problems related to agricultural products.

 Kasetsart Agricultural and Agro-Industrial Product Improvement Institute
Kasetsart Agricultural and Agro-Industrial Product Improvement Institute (KAPI), is an agricultural and agro-industrial product research institute, established on 29 July 1991 to research and develop quality standards in non-food innovation.

 Kasetsart University Institute for Advanced Studies
Kasetsart University Institute for Advanced Studies (KUIAS) consists of four research centers: the Center for Advanced Studies for Agriculture and Food; the Center for Advanced Studies in Tropical Natural Resources; the Center for Advanced Studies in Nanotechnology for Chemical, Food and Agricultural Industries; and the Center for Advanced Studies In Industrial Technology. They are responsible for carrying out targeted research initiatives.

 Princess Sirindhorn International Center for Research Development and Technology Transfer
Princess Sirindhorn International Center for Research Development and Technology Transfer (PSIC) is an agency established through a collaboration between the Bureau of the Royal Household and Kasetsart University with tasks in the royal projects according to Princess Maha Chakri Sirindhorn and the royal family in supporting and coordinating research, development and technology transfer at the national and international level. PSIC has visions to improve quality of life and well-being, promote knowledge to the disadvantaged, cooperate with the government, private sector and international organizations, create opportunities for people in remote areas.

 Center for Excellence in Silk
Housed at Kamphaeng Saen campus, the center is a provider of silkworm eggs and know-how to Thai farmers.

 Research Stations
Kasetsart University have research and training stations under supervision of Faculty of Agriculture, Faculty of Fisheries, Faculty of Forestry and Kamphaeng Saen campus located in various areas throughout Thailand, such as Faculty of Agriculture's research stations at Pak Chong, Thap Kwang, Khok Charoen, Phaniat, Khao Hin Son, Phetchabun, Doi Pui, Faculty of Fisheries's research stations at Si Racha, Khlong Wan, Samut Songkhram, Kamphaeng Saen, Ranong, Faculty of Forestry's research and training stations at Chiang Mai, Lampang (Huay Tak), Wang Nam Khiao, Hat Wanakon, Phang Nga, Trat and Kamphaeng Saen campus's research stations at Kamphaeng Saen, Kanchanaburi and Prachuap Khiri Khan.

International programs

Undergraduate programs

Postgraduate programs

Scholarships

Kasetsart University and donor agencies offers a wide range of scholarships for undergraduate and graduate:

Student society
 Kasetsart University Student Council (KUSC) is a KU student organization as set out in the 1952 student constitution.
 Kasetsart University Student Administrative Board (KUSAB) represents KU student interests in academic, social, and recreational activities.
 Student Unions represents faculty student and responsible for ceremonies, volunteering and other student activities of each faculty.

Honorary degrees 
The university has given honorary degrees to heads of state and other dignitaries:
 Prince Philip, Duke of Edinburgh, 23 July 1983
 Fumihito, Prince Akishino, 8 March 2011
 Benigno Aquino III, 27 May 2011
 Mohammed bin Salman, 19 November 2022

Notable alumni

 Princess Chulabhorn, a Thai princess who was awarded the UNESCO Albert Einstein medal for her efforts in promoting scientific collaboration in 1986
 Srirasmi Suwadee, a former member of the royal family of Thailand
 Rapee Sagarik, a Thai horticulturist, botanist and orchid expert and the 7th president of Kasetsart University
 Theera Wongsamut, a former Minister of Agriculture and Cooperatives
 Seub Nakhasathien, a Thai conservationist who was well known for his efforts to protect nature
 Prapat Panyachatraksa, a former Deputy Minister of Agriculture and Cooperatives and former Minister of Natural Resources and Environment
 Sutham Sangprathum, a former Deputy Minister of Interior, former Deputy Minister of Education and former Minister of University Affairs
 Pornchai Mongkhonvanit, the president of Siam University and a former president of International Association of University Presidents
 Chavalit Vidthayanon, a Thai ichthyologist and senior researcher of biodiversity of WWF Thailand
 Sunanta Kangvalkulkij, a Thai diplomat and the Chairperson of the General Council of the World Trade Organization for 2020
 Kiattipong Radchatagriengkai, the head coach of the Thailand women's national volleyball team
 Ratthasart Korrasud, a Thai pop singer, actor and IT/digital media expert
 Navin Yavapolkul, a Thai singer, actor and lecturer of economics at Kasetsart University
 Janjira Janchome, a Thai beauty queen and the Miss Thailand Universe 2002
 Khemanit Jamikorn, a Thai TV actress, singer and model
 Nat Thewphaingam, a Thai singer, actor, model, presenter and the winner of the 5th season of reality talent show True Academy Fantasia
 Pen-ek Karaket, a Thai taekwondo practitioner who competed at the 2012 Summer Olympics in the under 58 kg weight class
 Darvid Kreepolrerk, a Thai actor and singer, best known as Forth in 2Moons: The Series
 Napat Injaiuea, a Thai singer-songwriter, actor, writer and the winner of the 6th season of reality talent show The Star
 Suppasit Jongcheveevat, a Thai actor and model, best known as Tharn Thara Kirigun in TharnType: The Series
 Weluree Ditsayabut, a Thai beauty queen and the former Miss Universe Thailand 2014
 Punika Kulsoontornrut, a Thai beauty queen and the Miss Earth Thailand 2013
 Thanapob Leeratanakajorn, a Thai actor and model, best known as Phai in Hormones: The Series
 Prachaya Ruangroj, a Thai actor and model, best known as Kongpob in SOTUS: The Series
 Jirakit Thawornwong, a Thai actor and singer, best known as View in Room Alone 401-410
 Supassara Thanachat, a Thai actor and model, best known as Sprite in Hormones: The Series
 Perawat Sangpotirat, a Thai actor and model, best known as Arthit in SOTUS: The Series
 Thanapon Jarujitranon, a Thai actor and singer, best known as Beam in 2Moons: The Series
 Worranit Thawornwong, a Thai actress and model, best known as Junior in Ugly Duckling: Perfect Match
 Krit Amnuaydechkorn, a Thai actor and model, best known as Oh-aew in I Told Sunset About You
 Anchana Heemmina, a Thai human rights activist

Partner institutions

Some of Kasetsart University's partner institutions:

China Agricultural University
Cornell University
Huaqiao University
Korea University
KTH Royal Institute of Technology
Kyoto University
Massey University
Michigan State University
Nagoya University
National Chung Hsing University
National University of Singapore
Ocean University of China
Osaka University
Purdue University
RMIT University
Università della Svizzera italiana
University of British Columbia
University of California, Davis
University of Hohenheim
University of Melbourne
University of Montpellier
University of Oxford
University of the Philippines Los Baños
University of Strathclyde
University of Reading
University of Vienna
Waseda University
Yale University
Yonsei University
Zhejiang University

Wildlife at Bangkhen

The Bangkhen campus hosts the most diverse avifauna of any campus in Bangkok. The following species of bird can usually be found on campus all year round: little cormorant, Javan pond-heron, little egret, black-crowned night heron, Asian openbill, white-breasted waterhen, bronze-winged jacana, rock pigeon, spotted dove, zebra dove, red collared dove, pink-necked green pigeon, plaintive cuckoo, common koel, greater coucal, Indian roller, coppersmith barbet, Asian palm-swift, house swift, small minivet, common iora, streak-eared bulbul, yellow-vented bulbul, sooty-headed bulbul, large-billed crow, oriental magpie-robin, pied fantail, black-collared starling, Asian pied starling, common myna, white-vented myna, plain prinia, common tailorbird, brown-throated sunbird, olive-backed sunbird, scarlet-backed flowerpecker, white-rumped munia, scaly-breasted munia, Eurasian tree sparrow, house sparrow, Java sparrow. Common winter (generally October–March) visitors: Chinese pond-heron, intermediate egret, barn swallow (August–May), red-rumped swallow, blue-tailed bee-eater, red-breasted flycatcher, ashy drongo, brown shrike, black-naped oriole. Species which are seen there less often (but all year round but some very rarely): lesser whistling duck, cattle egret, great white egret, purple heron, black-winged stilt, red-wattled lapwing, common kingfisher, black-capped kingfisher, stork-billed kingfisher, vernal hanging-parrot, hoopoe, collared scops-owl, black drongo, green-billed malkoha, edible-nest swiftlet, ashy woodswallow, Asian golden weaver. Less common winter visitors or passage migrants: Eurasian kestrel, dark-sided flycatcher, verditer flycatcher.

See also

 List of universities in Thailand
 List of colleges and universities
 Kasetsart University Laboratory School

References

 
1943 establishments in Thailand
Agricultural universities and colleges
Chatuchak district
Educational institutions established in 1943
Forestry education
Universities and colleges in Bangkok
Veterinary schools
Universities established in the 20th century
Veterinary medicine in Thailand
Asian Games water polo venues